Gore Cove is an inlet cove in the Fleet lagoon behind Chesil Beach, on the south coast of Dorset, England, located on the Jurassic Coast World Heritage Site.

Herbury is a small peninsula jutting out into the Fleet by Gore Cove. The Moonfleet Manor Hotel is located close by. To the east is the coastal town of Weymouth. To the southeast is the Isle of Portland.

References

Coves of Dorset
Jurassic Coast